Cameron Robert Dick (born 1 January 1967) is an Australian politician and member of the Labor Party currently serving as the 51st Treasurer of Queensland. He previously served as  Minister for State Development, Manufacturing, Infrastructure and Planning and was Minister for Health and Minister for Ambulance Services in the Palaszczuk Ministry. He also served as Attorney-General, Minister for Education and Minister for Industrial Relations in the Bligh government. He is currently a member of the Queensland Legislative Assembly representing the seat of Woodridge.

Early life and education
Dick's family arrived in Queensland from Scotland in 1862 aboard the sailing ship Conway. His father, a veteran of the Second World War serving in the Royal Australian Navy (1941–1945), was a butcher and later an owner and operator of taxi cabs. His mother was a nurse.

He grew up in the suburb of Holland Park and attended a local primary school, Marshall Road State School.

Dick was educated at the Anglican Church Grammar School, formerly known as the Church of England Grammar School. He studied at the University of Queensland, and graduated with a Bachelor of Commerce and a Bachelor of Laws, and later, a Bachelor of Arts. He gained a Master of Law at Trinity Hall, Cambridge.

After undertaking articles of clerkship at Brisbane law firm Goss Downey Carne, he was admitted as a solicitor of the Supreme Court of Queensland and the High Court of Australia.

Legal career

Tuvalu
Following practice as a solicitor in Brisbane, Dick worked as an international development volunteer in the South Pacific island nation of Tuvalu from 1993 to 1996, under the Australian Volunteers Abroad program operated by the then Overseas Service Bureau (now known as Australian Volunteers International), Australia's oldest international volunteer-sending organisation. Dick assisted in the Office of the Attorney-General during his time in Tuvalu, initially as Crown Counsel and then as the acting Attorney-General of Tuvalu for one year. He is a former ex officio Attorney-General of the Pacific Island nation of Tuvalu.

Queensland
Dick was a solicitor at Crown Law, the Queensland Government's legal office, and  a senior advisor in the Queensland Government, before becoming a barrister in 2006. He practised law prior to his election to the Queensland Parliament.

Political career
Dick was elected as the Member for Greenslopes in the Queensland Parliament at the 2009 Queensland state election. Queensland Premier Anna Bligh asked him to serve as the Attorney-General and Minister for Industrial Relations. He was sworn in as Attorney-General and Minister for Industrial Relations on 26 March 2009. On 21 February 2011 he was sworn in as Minister for Education and Industrial Relations. He lost his seat at the 2012 state election. He gained a new seat, Woodridge, at the 2015 state election, and did so with the largest two-party preferred vote (75.95 per cent) of any party in any electorate of Queensland.

On 16 February 2015, Dick was sworn in as Minister for Health and Minister for Ambulance Services in the Palaszczuk Ministry.

On 12 December 2017, Dick was sworn in as Minister for State Development, Manufacturing, Infrastructure and Planning in the second Palaszczuk Ministry.

Alongside Queensland Premier Annastacia Palaszczuk and representatives from the Australian Government, including then Prime Minister Malcolm Turnbull, Dick was part of the announcement on 14 March 2018 that Rheinmetall Defence Australia would be awarded the $5 billion LAND 400 contract to build and service up to 5000 military vehicles in Queensland. Regarding the decision, Dick called the "landmark project" an "economic game-changer" that will create "450 advanced manufacturing and engineering jobs for Queenslanders" and "pump $1 billion into the state’s economy" in its first ten years of operation. Following this, Rheinmetall selected Redbank, near Ipswich, as the location for its $170 million Military Vehicle Centre of Excellence (MILVEHCOE). The first sod was turned at the facility 16 November 2018, with reference made to Queensland as "Australia's khaki state".

Dick was in attendance to press the launch button for Australia's first commercial payload rocket flight on 21 November 2018. The five-metre rocket was developed by Queensland-based BlackSky Aerospace and successfully launched into the sky from a farm in Tarawara, west of Goondiwindi. Dick said that the launch – which saw the rocket reach roughly the same height as Mount Everest – showed the possibilities for developing a space industry in Queensland. He added that the state wanted to promote its aerospace capabilities to national and international markets, and that this launch was a substantial step forward in achieving that aim.

In May 2020, Dick replaced Jackie Trad as Queensland Treasurer.

Personal life 

Dick is married and has two sons, Jonathan and Samuel Dick. 

He is the brother of Milton Dick, a member of the Australian House of Representatives for Oxley, Speaker of the House of Representatives and former Brisbane City Council Labor leader.

See also
Bligh Ministry
First Palaszczuk Ministry
Second Palaszczuk Ministry
Third Palaszczuk Ministry

References 

1967 births
Living people
Members of the Queensland Legislative Assembly
Australian Labor Party members of the Parliament of Queensland
Labor Right politicians
Attorneys-General of Queensland
Treasurers of Queensland
Australian barristers
Australian solicitors
Alumni of Trinity Hall, Cambridge
University of Queensland alumni
People educated at Anglican Church Grammar School
Australian people of Scottish descent
21st-century Australian politicians